Tayler is a surname and given name, and may refer to:

Given name 

Tayler Hill (born 1990), American basketball player
Tayler Holder (born 1997), American TikTok star
Tayler Malsam (born 1989), American professional stock car racing driver
Tayler Saucedo (born 1993), American baseball player
Tayler Scott (born 1992), South African born American baseball player

Surname 
Alasdair Tayler (1870–1937), British historical writer; brother of Hetty Tayler
Albert Chevallier Tayler (1862–1925), English artist
Bert Tayler (1887–1984), English cricketer
Charles Benjamin Tayler (1797–1875), British Church of England clergyman and author
Charles Foot Tayler (1794–1853), English portrait miniaturist
Collette Tayler (1951–2017), Australian academic in early childhood education
Hetty Tayler (1869–1951), British historical writer; sister of Alasdair Tayler
Howard Tayler (contemporary), American artist and web cartoonist
Jeffrey Tayler (contemporary), American author and journalist
John Tayler (1742–1829), American merchant and politician from New York; state legislator and acting governor 1817
John Frederick Tayler, (1802–1889), English landscape watercolour painter.
Josias Tayler (b. 1787, d. unknown), Canadian merchant, judge, and politician
Kathy Tayler (b. 1960), Welsh pentathlete and TV presenter
Robert Walker Tayler (1852–1910), American politician from Ohio; U.S. Representative 1895–1903
Robert Walker Tayler Sr. (1812–1878), American politician from Ohio.
Roger Tayler (1929–1997), British astronomer
Sally Tayler (contemporary), Australian actress

Occupational surnames